Alfredo Girón Sopeña (born 11 February 1975) is a Spanish rower.Now is teacher in the IES Antonio Alvarez López. He competed in the men's lightweight coxless four event at the 1996 Summer Olympics.

Notes

References

External links
 
 

1975 births
Living people
Spanish male rowers
Olympic rowers of Spain
Rowers at the 1996 Summer Olympics
Sportspeople from Seville